The 2013 Philippine Basketball Association (PBA) Commissioner's Cup was the second conference of the 2012–13 PBA season. The tournament began on February 8 and ended on May 19, 2013. The tournament is an import-laden format, which requires an import or a pure-foreign player for each team and with no height limit. From the semifinal round onwards, the tournament is sponsored by Cebuana Lhuillier.

Format
Due to the preparations of the Philippines men's national basketball team for the upcoming FIBA Asia Championship, the opening of Governors' Cup was moved on the second week of August, at the conclusion of the FIBA tournament. The Commissioner's Cup was extended until the last week of May and adapted the tournament format used during the Philippine Cup.

The tournament format for this conference was as follows:
Two-round eliminations, with each team playing 14 games. The teams are divided into two groups on the basis of their rankings from the previous Philippine Cup. Each team will play teams within their group once, while they will play teams from the other group twice. Standings will be determined in one league table; teams do not qualify by basis of groupings.
Group A:
Talk 'N Text Tropang Texters (#1)
Alaska Aces (#4)
Meralco Bolts (#5)
Air21 Express (#8)
Barako Bull Energy Cola (#9)
Group B:
Rain or Shine Elasto Painters (#2)
San Mig Coffee Mixers (#3)
Barangay Ginebra San Miguel (#6)
Petron Blaze Boosters (#7)
GlobalPort Batang Pier (#10)
Top eight teams will advance to the quarterfinals. In case of tie, playoffs will be held only for the #2 and #8 seeds.
Quarterfinals:
QF1: #1 seed vs #8 seed (#1 seed twice-to-beat)
QF2: #2 seed vs #7 seed (#2 seed twice-to-beat)
QF3: #3 seed vs #6 seed (best-of-3 series)
QF4: #4 seed vs #5 seed (best-of-3 series)
Semifinals (best-of-5 series):
SF1: QF1 vs. QF4 winners
SF2: QF2 vs. QF3 winners
Finals (best-of-5 series)
Winners of the semifinals

Elimination round

Team standings

Schedule

Results

Bracket

Quarterfinals

(1) Alaska vs. (8) Air21

(2) Rain or Shine vs. (7) Barangay Ginebra

(3) Petron vs. (6) Talk 'N Text

(4) San Mig Coffee vs. (5) Meralco

Semifinals

(1) Alaska vs. (4) San Mig Coffee

(6) Talk 'N Text vs. (7) Barangay Ginebra

Finals

Awards

Conference
Best Player of the Conference: LA Tenorio (Barangay Ginebra) 
Bobby Parks Best Import of the Conference: Robert Dozier (Alaska)
Finals MVP: Sonny Thoss (Alaska)

Players of the Week

Imports 
The following is the list of imports, which had played for their respective teams at least once, with the returning imports in italics. Highlighted are the imports who stayed with their respective teams for the whole conference.

References

External links
 PBA.ph

PBA Commissioner's Cup
Commissioner's Cup